José Rodrigues (1828–1887) was a Portuguese Romantic painter.

José Rodrigues may also refer to:

 José Carlos Rodrigues (1844–1922), Brazilian journalist, financial expert, and philanthropist
 José Ricardo Rodrigues (born 1974), Brazilian boxer
 José Rodrigues Miguéis (1901–1980), Portuguese translator and writer
 José Rodrigues Neto (born 1949), Brazilian football player
 José Rodrigues dos Santos (born 1964), Portuguese writer, lecturer, and journalist
 José Manuel Rodrigues (born 1951), Portuguese-Dutch photographer and visual artist